James Finley Ransone III (born June 2, 1979) is an American actor and musician. He is known for his roles as Ziggy Sobotka in the second season of the drama series The Wire, United States Marine Corps Cpl. Josh Ray Person in the war drama miniseries Generation Kill (2008), The Deputy in the supernatural horror films Sinister (2012) and Sinister 2 (2015), Chester in Tangerine (2015), the adult Eddie Kaspbrak in It Chapter Two (2019), and Max in The Black Phone (2021).

Life
Ransone was born and raised in Baltimore, Maryland, the son of Joyce (née Peterson) and James Finley Ransone II, a Vietnam War veteran. He was educated at the George Washington Carver Center for Arts and Technology in Baltimore and attended the School of Visual Arts in Manhattan for one year.

In May 2021, on his Instagram account, Ransone wrote that he was sexually abused by his math tutor Timothy Rualo in 1992. He reported his allegations to the Baltimore County police in March 2020, but they declined to pursue the charges after an investigation. An investigation by the Baltimore school system has not yet been resolved.

By the age of 27, Ransone had developed a heroin addiction and a debt of $30,000, but became sober in 2007.

He is married to Jamie McPhee, with whom he has a son.

Career
In 2002, Ransone co-starred in the Harmony Korine drama film Ken Park as Tate. In 2003, he was featured in 12 episodes of The Wire, as Ziggy Sobotka. He starred in the 2008 miniseries Generation Kill as Cpl. Josh Ray Person. 

In 2010, he was cast in a recurring role in the HBO comedy series How to Make It in America, and the following year, appeared in a recurring role in the HBO drama series Treme. In 2012, he starred in the drama film Starlet. The following year, he starred in the AMC drama series Low Winter Sun as Damon Callis.

Ransone then starred in the 2012 horror film Sinister in the supporting role of Deputy So-and-So. 

In June 2014, Ransone joined the cast of the Western film In a Valley of Violence. Also in 2014, Ransone starred in Small Engine Repair off-Broadway. 

In 2015, he had a co-starring role in the comedy-drama film Tangerine. Following the success of Sinister, Ransone appeared in the 2015 sequel Sinister 2, reprising his role from the first film but now as the main character. In 2016, Ransone appeared in Season 2 of the drama series Bosch as Eddie Arceneaux. 

In 2019, Ransone played Eddie Kaspbrak (sharing the role with Jack Dylan Grazer) in the horror film It Chapter Two, for which he received critical praise.

Filmography

Film

Television

Theater

References

External links
 

1979 births
21st-century American male actors
American male film actors
American male television actors
Living people
Male actors from Baltimore
Independent Spirit Award winners